The 1933 Ohio Bobcats football team was an American football team that represented Ohio University as a member of the Buckeye Athletic Association (BAA) during the 1933 college football season. In their tenth season under head coach Don Peden, the Bobcats compiled a 6–2–1 record, shut out six of nine opponents, and outscored all opponents by a total of 227 to 28.

Schedule

References

Ohio
Ohio Bobcats football seasons
Ohio Bobcats football